Tephra is fragmental material produced by a volcanic eruption regardless of composition, fragment size, or emplacement mechanism.

Volcanologists also refer to airborne fragments as pyroclasts. Once clasts have fallen to the ground, they remain as tephra unless hot enough to fuse into pyroclastic rock or tuff. Tephrochronology is a geochronological technique that uses discrete layers of tephra—volcanic ash from a single eruption—to create a chronological framework in which paleoenvironmental or archaeological records can be placed. When a volcano explodes, it releases a variety of tephra including ash, cinders, and blocks. These layers settle on the land and, over time, sedimentation occurs incorporating these tephra layers into the geologic record. Often, when a volcano explodes, biological organisms are killed and their remains are buried within the tephra layer. These fossils are later dated by scientists to determine the age of the fossil and its place within the geologic record.

Overview

Tephra is unconsolidated pyroclastic material produced by a volcanic eruption. It consists of a variety of materials, typically glassy particles formed by the cooling of droplets of magma, which may be vesicular, solid or flake-like, and a varying proportions of crystalline and mineral components originating from the mountain and the walls of the vent. As the particles fall to the ground, they are sorted to a certain extent by the wind and gravitational forces and form layers of unconsolidated material. The particles are further moved by ground surface or submarine water flow.

The distribution of tephra following an eruption usually involves the largest boulders falling to the ground quickest, therefore closest to the vent, while smaller fragments travel further – ash can often travel for thousands of miles, even circumglobal, as it can stay in the stratosphere for days to weeks following an eruption.
When large amounts of tephra accumulate in the atmosphere from massive volcanic eruptions (or from a multitude of smaller eruptions occurring simultaneously), they can reflect light and heat from the sun back through the atmosphere, in some cases causing the temperature to drop, resulting in a temporary "volcanic winter". The effects of acidic rain and snow, the precipitation caused by tephra discharges into the atmosphere, can be seen for years after the eruptions have stopped. Tephra eruptions can affect ecosystems across millions of square kilometres or even entire continents depending on the size of the eruption.

Classification
Tephra fragments are classified by size:

 Ash – particles smaller than 2 mm (0.08 inches) in diameter
 Lapilli or volcanic cinders – between 2 and 64 mm (0.08 and 2.5 inches) in diameter
 Volcanic bombs or volcanic blocks – larger than 64 mm (2.5 inches) in diameter

The use of tephra layers, which bear their own unique chemistry and character, as temporal marker horizons in archaeological and geological sites, is known as tephrochronology.

Etymology

Environmental impacts 
The release of tephra into the troposphere impacts the environment physically and chemically. Physically, volcanic blocks damage local flora and human settlements. Ash damages communication and electrical systems, coats forests and plant life reducing photosynthesis, and pollutes groundwater. Tephra changes below- and above-ground air and water movement. Chemically, tephra release can impact the water cycle. Tephra particles can cause ice crystals to grow in clouds which increases precipitation. Nearby watersheds and the ocean can experience elevated mineral levels, especially iron, which can cause explosive population growth in plankton communities. This, in turn, can result in eutrophication.

Disciplines and fossil record 
In addition to tephrochronology, tephra is used by a variety of scientific disciplines including geology, paleoecology, anthropology, and paleontology, to date fossils, identify dates within the fossils record, and learn about prehistoric cultures and ecosystems. For example, carbonatite tephra found at Oldoinyo Lengai (a volcano in the East African Rift Valley) has buried and preserved fossilized footprints of humans near the site of the eruption. Under certain conditions, volcanic blocks can be preserved for billions of years and can travel up to 400 km away from the eruption. Volcanic eruptions around the world have provided valuable scientific information on local ecosystems and ancient cultures.

Volcanoes

Africa 
Africa's volcanoes have had an impact on the fossil record. Geographically a part of Africa, El Hierro is a shield volcano and the youngest and smallest of the Canary Islands. The most recent El Hierro eruption occurred underwater, in 2011, and caused earthquakes and landslides throughout the Canary Islands. Instead of ash, floating rocks, 'restingolites' were released after every eruption. After the 2011 eruption, fossils of single-celled marine organisms were found in the restingolites verifying the origin theory that Canary Island growth comes from a single buoyant jet of magma from the Earth's core instead of cracks in the ocean floor. This is reflected in the decreasing age of the islands east to west from Fuerteventura to El Hierro.  There are about 60 volcanoes in Ethiopia, located in east Africa. In Southern Ethiopia, the Omo Kibish Rock Formation is composed of layers of tephra and sediment. Within these layers, several fossils have been discovered.  In 1967, 2 Homo sapiens fossils were discovered in the Omo Kibish Formation by Richard Leaky, a paleoanthropologist. After radiocarbon dating, they were determined to be 195 thousand years old. Other mammals discovered in the formation include Hylochoerus meinertzhageni (forest hog) and Cephalophus (antelope).

Antarctica 
Antarctica has a unique volcanic history. Today, volcanic activity occurs on islands located off the coast of Antarctica. One of the most active islands is Ross Island which has 4 volcanoes: Mount Erebus, Mount Terror, Mount Bird, and Mount Haddington. The most active of these four volcanoes is Mount Erebus, a stratovolcano, which has been continuously erupting since 2019 and is most famous for its lava lake. About 252 million years ago, the Permian-Triassic extinction event marked the transition between the Paleozoic era and Mesozoic era. This event included repeated meteor strikes which produced large volcanic eruptions releasing large quantities of methane gas into the atmosphere. During this time, Antarctica was still attached to South America. When the volcanoes erupted, whole forests growing in Antarctica were covered in lava. In 2015, a group of researchers led by Erik Gulbranson, professor at the University of Wisconsin–Milwaukee, discovered the Allan Hills fossil forest which dates back to the Triassic Period, about 252 to 200 million years ago. Many fossil forests have been found throughout Antarctica and are of interest to scientists around the world.

Asia 
In Asia, several volcanic eruptions are still influencing local cultures today. In North Korea, Paektu Mountain, a stratovolcano, first erupted in 946 AD and is a religious site for locals. It last erupted in 1903. In 2017, new fossil evidence was discovered that determined the date of Paektu Mountain's first eruption, which had been a mystery. A team of scientists directed by Dr. Clive Oppenheimer, British volcanologist, discovered a larch trunk embedded within Paektu Mountain. After radiocarbon dating, the larch was determined to be 264 years old which coincides with the 946 AD eruption. Its tree rings are being studied and many new discoveries are being made about North Korea during that time.

In northeastern China, a large volcanic eruption in the early Cretaceous caused the fossilization of an entire ecosystem known as the Jehol Biota when powerful pyroclastic flows inundated the area. The deposits include many perfectly preserved fossils of dinosaurs, birds, mammals, reptiles, fish, frogs, plants, and insects.

Australia 
Australia's newly discovered prehistoric volcanoes are of interest to scientists worldwide because, at present, they are the oldest in Australia. There are only two active volcanoes in Australia, one located on Heard Island and the other one in the McDonald Islands. However, in 2019, about 100 prehistoric volcanoes were discovered underneath the Cooper-Eromanga Basins by teams of scientists from the University of Adelaide in Australia and the University of Aberdeen in Scotland. These volcanoes date back to the Jurassic Period, 160 to 180 million years ago. Researchers are excited about discovering more volcanoes underneath Australia and learning more about Australia's landscape during the Jurassic Period.

Europe 
Europe's volcanoes provide unique information about the history of Italy. Mount Vesuvius, a stratovolcano, last erupted in March 1944, located in southern Italy. In 79 AD, Mount Vesuvius erupted covering the city of Pompeii in molten lava, ash, pumice volcanic blocks, and toxic gases. The entire eruption lasted 12 to 18 hours. Afterwards, everything was perfectly preserved and fossilized by the volcanic ash and has provided valuable information about the Roman culture. Also, in Italy, Stromboli volcano, a stratovolcano, last erupted in July 2019. In 2013, a team of researchers led by Ingrid Smet and  Dr. Tom Pfeiffer, volcanologists, discovered dinosaur fossil footprints, from Diplodocus hallorum, in thick layers of ash.

North America 

Several volcanic eruptions have been studied in North America. On 18 May 1980, Mount St. Helens, a stratovolcano in Washington state, erupted, spreading five hundred million tons of tephra ash across Washington, Oregon, Montana and Idaho causing earthquakes, rockslides, and megatsunami which severely altered the topography of nearby areas. The effects of the Mount St. Helens eruption were felt as far away as Yellowstone National Park, where eruption-related flooding caused trees to collapse and wash into lake beds where they fossilized. Nearby forests were flooded, removing bark, leaves, and tree limbs. In 2006, the Augustine Volcano in Alaska erupted generating earthquakes, avalanches, and projected tephra ash approximately two hundred and ninety kilometers away. This dome volcano is over forty thousand years old and has erupted 11 times since 1800.

South America 

In South America, there are several historic active volcanoes. In southern Chile, the Chaitén volcano erupted in 2011 adding 160 meters to its rim. Prehistoric weapons and tools, formed from obsidian tephra blocks, were dated at 5,610 years ago and were discovered 400 km away. Due to the location of the subduction zone of the eastern Pacific's Nazca Plate, there are twenty one active volcanoes in southern Peru. In 2006, fossils, found under a layer of volcanic ash in Peru, were excavated by a team of paleontologists led by Mark D. Uhen, professor at George Mason University. The fossils were identified as 3 different types of archaeocetes, prehistoric whales, and are older than 36.61 million years which, as of 2011,  makes them the oldest whale fossils discovered.

References

External links 

Volcanic materials identification

 
Igneous petrology

de:Pyroklastisches Sediment
pl:Materiał piroklastyczny
sv:Pyroklastiskt material